California's 49th district may refer to:

 California's 49th congressional district
 California's 49th State Assembly district